The emerald tree monitor (Varanus prasinus) or green tree monitor, is a small to medium-sized arboreal monitor lizard.  It is known for its unusual coloration, which consists of shades from green to turquoise, topped with dark, transverse dorsal banding. This coloration helps camouflage it in its arboreal habitat. Its color also makes the emerald tree monitor highly prized in both the pet trade and zoos alike.

Names
It is known as wbl km in the Kalam language of Papua New Guinea.

Taxonomy
Varanus prasinus was first described as Monitor viridis by John Edward Gray in 1831; however, Gray's original holotype (RMNH 4812 in the National Natural History Museum in Leiden) was lost and the species was redescribed by Schlegel eight years later as V. prasinus using the found specimen. The generic name Varanus is derived from the Arabic word waral (ورل), which translates to English as "monitor".  Its specific name, prasinus, is Latin for the color green.

Varanus prasinus is a member of the subgenus Euprepiosaurus. It is closely related to several other arboreal species; when combined, these are often referred to as the V. prasinus species group or species complex. In addition to V. prasinus, this species group, whose members are all allopatric, includes V. beccarii (Aru Islands), V. boehmei (Waigeo Island), V. bogerti (D'Entrecasteaux Archipelago), V. keithhornei (Cape York Peninsula), V. kordensis (Biak Island), V. macraei (Batanta Island), V. reisingeri (Misool Island) and V. telenesetes (Rossel Island).

Evolutionary history
The family Varanidae probably originated in Asia about 65 million years ago, although some estimates are as early as the late Mesozoic (112 million years ago). Monitor lizards probably migrated to Australia and the Indonesian archipelago between 39 and 26 million years ago. All members of the V. prasinus species group (sometimes referred to as subgenus Euprepiosaurus) are found east of Lydekker’s line in the Indo-Australian Archipelago. This group probably originated in the Moluccas, although dating their origins is complicated by the paucity of the fossil record. The absence of large placental predatory mammals east of Wallace's line may be partially responsible for the radiation of the V. prasinus group in the Australo-Papuan region.

Distribution
Emerald tree monitors and their close relatives can be found on the island of New Guinea (split between Indonesia and Papua New Guinea) as well as several adjacent islands, and the northern Torres Strait Islands. The green tree monitor is reported to thrive in lowland environments, including tropical evergreen forests, palm swamps and cocoa plantations.

Description

It uses its prehensile tail and long claws to grip branches. Unlike other varanids, this monitor defends its tail rather than lashing with it for defense when threatened. The soles of the feet of the emerald tree monitor have enlarged scales which aid the lizard when climbing.

Ecology
When threatened, the emerald tree monitor will flee through vegetation or bite if cornered.

It is one of the few social monitors, living in small groups made up of a dominant male, several females, and a few other males and juveniles.

Diet
The emerald tree monitor's diet consists of large tree-dwelling arthropods, such as katydids, grasshoppers, other orthopterans, stick insects, cockroaches, beetles, centipedes, spiders and crabs, as well as birds  and small mammals (such as the Moncton's mosaic-tailed rat). Before swallowing stick insects, the lizards tear off the legs. Captive specimens tear off the limbs of rodents prior to eating them; as a result, they are capable of swallowing mammals of a considerable size: A 135-g lizard was documented as eating a 40-g rodent, almost one-third its size.  Paleontologist and  Temple University professor Michael Balsai has observed V. prasinus eating fruit (bananas) in captivity as has herpetologist and author Robert G. Sprackland.

Reproduction
As many as three clutches are laid throughout the year; clutches have been laid by captives in January, March, April, November, and December. The female emerald tree monitor lays her eggs in arboreal termite nests. The eggs hatch between 160 and 190 days later, typically from June to November, after which the young eat the termites and the termite's eggs within minutes of hatching. Sexual maturity is reached in about one year.

References

External links
 Photos at Biolib.cz
 Ozanimals.com
 Mampam.com

Varanus
Monitor lizards of Australia
Reptiles of Indonesia
Monitor lizards of New Guinea
Reptiles of Papua New Guinea
Reptiles described in 1839
Taxa named by Hermann Schlegel